Akesuk Tudlik, commonly known simply as Tudlik (1890–1966), was an Inuit printmaker and carver from Cape Dorset, Canada. He is best known for his stylized carvings of animals, particularly birds with round eyes.

Early life 
He was born in 1890 near Kimmirut, Nunavut, Canada.

Career 
Tudlik and his family moved to the Kinngait area in 1951, and he began selling his carvings to James Houston. He began printmaking around the same time, and was involved in the West Baffin Eskimo Co-operative. His work often depicted bears and owls, as well as hunters pursuing prey.

His work is held at several museums worldwide, including the Museum of Modern Art, the Winnipeg Art Gallery, the Art Gallery of Ontario, the National Gallery of Canada, the National Museum of the American Indian, the University of Michigan Museum of Art, the Scott Polar Research Institute, the Museum of Anthropology at UBC, the McMichael Canadian Art Collection, the Montreal Museum of Fine Arts, and the Dennos Museum Center.

Later life 
His sons Solomonie Tigullaraq and Latcholassie Akesuk became artists as well.

References 

People from Kimmirut
1890 births
1966 deaths
Inuit printmakers
Inuit sculptors
20th-century Canadian sculptors
20th-century Canadian printmakers
Inuit from Nunavut
People from Kinngait
Canadian male sculptors
20th-century Canadian male artists